is a Jōdo shū Buddhist temple in Kaminokuni, Hokkaidō, Japan.

See also
 Pure Land Buddhism
 Cultural Properties of Japan

References

Buddhist temples in Hokkaido
Important Cultural Properties of Japan